WCDE is a Christian Worship formatted broadcast radio station licensed to Elkins, West Virginia & serves Metro Elkins with programming from the Air 1 radio network.  WCDE is owned and operated by Davis and Elkins College.

References

External links
 

CDE
Air1 radio stations
CDE